In mathematics, the 15 theorem or Conway–Schneeberger Fifteen Theorem, proved by John H. Conway and W. A. Schneeberger in 1993, states that if a positive definite quadratic form with integer matrix represents all positive integers up to 15, then it represents all positive integers. The proof was complicated, and was never published. Manjul Bhargava found a much simpler proof which was published in 2000.

Bhargava used the occasion of his receiving the 2005 SASTRA Ramanujan Prize to announce that he and Jonathan P. Hanke had cracked Conway's conjecture that a similar theorem holds for integral quadratic forms, with the constant 15 replaced by 290.  The proof has since appeared in preprint form.

Details 

Suppose  is a symmetric matrix with real entries. For any vector  with integer components, define

This function is called a quadratic form. We say  is positive definite if  whenever . If  is always an integer, we call the function  an integral quadratic form.

We get an integral quadratic form whenever the matrix entries  are integers; then  is said to have integer matrix. However,  will still be an integral quadratic form if the off-diagonal entries  are integers divided by 2, while the diagonal entries are integers. For example, x2 + xy + y2 is integral but does not have integral matrix.

A positive integral quadratic form taking all positive integers as values is called universal. The 15 theorem says that a quadratic form with integer matrix is universal if it takes the numbers from 1 to 15 as values. A more precise version says that, if a positive definite quadratic form with integral matrix takes the values 1, 2, 3, 5, 6, 7, 10, 14, 15 , then it takes all positive integers as values. Moreover, for each of these 9 numbers, there is such a quadratic form taking all other 8 positive integers except for this number as values.

For example, the quadratic form

is universal, because every positive integer can be written as a sum of 4 squares, by Lagrange's four-square theorem. By the 15 theorem, to verify this, it is sufficient to check that every positive integer up to 15 is a sum of 4 squares. (This does not give an alternative proof of Lagrange's theorem, because Lagrange's theorem is used in the proof of the 15 theorem.)

On the other hand,

is a positive definite quadratic form with integral matrix that takes as values all positive integers other than 15.

The 290 theorem says a positive definite integral quadratic form is universal if it takes the numbers from 1 to 290 as values. A more precise version states that, if an integer valued integral quadratic form represents all the numbers 1, 2, 3, 5, 6, 7, 10, 13, 14, 15, 17, 19, 21, 22, 23, 26, 29, 30, 31, 34, 35, 37, 42, 58, 93, 110, 145, 203, 290 , then it represents all positive integers, and for each of these 29 numbers, there is such a quadratic form representing all other 28 positive integers with the exception of this one number.

Bhargava has found analogous criteria for a quadratic form with integral matrix to represent all primes (the set {2, 3, 5, 7, 11, 13, 17, 19, 23, 29, 31, 37, 41, 43, 47, 67, 73} ) and for such a quadratic form to represent all positive odd integers (the set {1, 3, 5, 7, 11, 15, 33} ).

Expository accounts of these result have been written by Hahn and Moon (who provides proofs).

References

Additive number theory
Theorems in number theory
Quadratic forms